Chivilcoy Partido is a partido in the northern area of Buenos Aires Province in Argentina.

Settlements
Chivilcoy
Moquehua
Gorostiaga
Emilio Ayarza
La Rica
San Sebastián
Benítez
Henry Bell
Indacochea
Palemon Huergo
Ramón Biaus

External links

 
 Everything about Chivilcoy 
 History, geography and Population of Chivilcoy
 Information about Chivilcoy
 Website with information about Chivilcoy

1845 establishments in Argentina
Partidos of Buenos Aires Province